The Mary and Peter Biggs Award for Poetry is an award at the Ockham New Zealand Book Awards, presented annually to the winner of the poetry category. The winner receives a 10,000 prize.

History
The New Zealand Book Awards were set up by the New Zealand Literary Fund, a government organisation, in 1976. Annual awards were presented for literary merit in fiction, non-fiction, poetry and (later) book production.

The Goodman Fielder Wattie Book Awards, New Zealand's other principal literary awards event, did not specifically award poetry prizes until 1994, when sponsorship was taken over by Montana Wines and the event's name was changed to the Montana Book Awards. In 1994 and 1995, the Montana Book Awards included a category for poetry.

In 1996, the two awards events were merged to create the Montana New Zealand Book Awards, and offering prizes in six categories, including poetry. In 2010, the New Zealand Post took over as sponsor, having supported the New Zealand Book Awards for Children and Young Adults for the previous 14 years.

In 2015, Auckland property development firm Ockham Residential assumed sponsorship of the awards. No prizes were presented in that year. The Poetry Award was presented from 2016 to 2019. In 2020, the name of the award was changed to the Mary and Peter Biggs Award for Poetry.

Winners of the Mary and Peter Biggs Award for Poetry, 2020–present
 2022: Joanna Preston, Tumble. Otago University Press
 2021: Tusiata Avia, The Savage Coloniser Book. Victoria University Press
2020: Helen Rickerby, How to Live. Auckland University Press

Winners of the Ockhams New Zealand Book Award for Poetry, 2016–2019
 2019: Helen Heath, Are Friends Electric?. Victoria University Press
 2018: Elizabeth Smither, Night Horse. Auckland University Press
 2017: Andrew Johnston, Fits & Starts. Victoria University Press
 2016: David Eggleton, The Conch Trumpet.  Otago University Press

Winners of the New Zealand Post Book Award for Poetry, 2010–2014
 2014: Vincent O'Sullivan, Us, Then. Victoria University Press
 2013: Anne Kennedy, The Darling North. Auckland University Press
 2012: Rhian Gallagher, Shift. Auckland University Press
 2011: Kate Camp, The Mirror of Simple Annihilated Souls. Victoria University Press
 2010: Brian Turner, Just This. Victoria University Press

Winners of the Montana New Zealand Book Award for Poetry, 1996–2009
 2009: Jenny Bornholdt, The Rocky Shore. Victoria University Press
 2008: Janet Charman, Cold Snack. Auckland University Press
 2007: Janet Frame, The Goose Bath. Vintage
 2006: Bill Manhire, Lifted. Victoria University Press
 2005: Vincent O'Sullivan, Nice morning for it, Adam
 2004: Anne Kennedy, Sing-song
 2003: Glenn Colquhoun, Playing God 
 2002: Hone Tuwhare, Piggy-Back Moon 
 2001: Allen Curnow, The Bells of Saint Babels 
 2000: Elizabeth Smither, The Lark Quartet 
 1999: Vincent O'Sullivan, Seeing You Asked 
 1998: Hone Tuwhare, Shape-Shifter 
 1997: Jenny Bornholdt, Gregory O'Brien, Mark Williams, eds., Anthology of New Zealand Poetry in English 
 1996: Bill Manhire, My Sunshine

Winners of the Montana Book Award for Poetry, 1994–1995
 1995, Michael Jackson, Pieces of Music 
 1994, Bill Manhire, ed., 100 New Zealand Poems

Winners of the New Zealand Book Award for Poetry, 1976–1995
 1995: Michele Leggott, Dia 
 1994: Andrew Johnston, How to Talk 
 1993: Brian Turner, Beyond 
 1992: Bill Manhire, Milky Way Bar 
 1991: Cilla McQueen, Berlin Diary 
 1990: Elizabeth Smither, A Pattern of Marching 
 1989: Cilla McQueen, Benzina 
 1988: Anne French, All Cretans are Liars 
 1987: Allen Curnow, The Loop in Lone Kauri Road 
 1987: Elizabeth Nannestad, Jump 
 1986: Kendrick Smithyman, Stories About Wooden Keyboards 
 1985: Bill Manhire, Zoetropes 
 1984: Fleur Adcock, Selected Poems 
 1983: Allen Curnow, You Will Know When You Get There 
 1983: Cilla McQueen, Homing In 
 1982: Alistair Campbell, Collected Poems 
 1981: Michael Jackson, Wall 
 1988: Allen Curnow, An Incorrigible Music 
 1979: Kevin Ireland, Literary Cartoons 
 1978: Bill Manhire, How to Take Your Clothes Off at a Picnic 
 1978: Ian Wedde, Spells for Coming Down 
 1977: Ruth Dallas, Walking in the Snow 
 1977: Alan Loney, Dear Mondrian 
 1976: Louis Johnson, Fires and Patterns 
 1976: C.K. Stead, Quesada

See also
List of poetry awards
List of years in poetry
List of years in literature

Notes

External links
 Official website of the Ockham New Zealand Book Awards

New Zealand poetry awards